Italian Italo disco band Scotch have released two studio albums, three compilation albums and eight singles.

Albums

Studio albums

Compilation albums

Singles

References 

Discographies of Italian artists
Pop music group discographies